Front was a British men's magazine. First published by Cabal Communications in 1998, it was created to rival IPC's publication Loaded, catering to a demographic of 16- to 25-year-old males. It began as part of the British "lads' mag" genre of magazines, though the covers rejected this description with the statement "Front is no lads' mag".

Whilst a major selling point was the photo-shoots of models, the magazine also focused heavily on music, films, gadgets and games, plus sections on fashion and sport. Glamour shoots within the magazine usually involved well-known models rather than celebrities.

The magazine had also been responsible for a number of high-profile stunts, most notably smuggling an Eric Cantona lookalike, Karl Power, into the Manchester United team photo during a Champions League game.

On 7 February 2014, Front magazine announced on its Facebook page that it had ceased operations and the magazine would no longer be published. The next month, on 18 March 2014, the magazine announced they would be returning by writing "And FRONT said onto her, I am the resurrection, and the life; he that believeth in me, though FRONT were dead, yet shall FRONT live!"

Front magazine was relaunched with Editor Ryan Child at the helm in November 2016. The new editions held true to the tongue in cheek humour of the original issues. The focus in content shifted slightly to issues including homelessness, UK opiate abuse and the refugee crisis, while also still featuring high-profile models, movies and style. Music also remained at the forefront of Front's content, with interviews with The Offspring and Big Narstie filed in 2016. The revitalized Front also featured a major focus on MMA and other action sports, building a hard core fanbase from its 2 million social media followers. However, this relaunch was short-lived; the magazine ceased publication after its 198th issue in 2017. Its social media presence is still intermittently active as of September 2020, primarily showcasing models.

Owners
Cabal Communications (1998–2003)
Highbury House (2003–2006) 
SMD Publishing (2006–2007) 
Flip Media (2007–2008) 
Sports Media Group (2008–2009) 
The Kane Corporation (2009 – closure in 2014)
Live Love Publishing (2014–2015)

Notable cover models

Jo Guest, August 1999 and May 2002
DJ Sassy, October 1999
Jordan, January 2001, July 2003, September 2003 and March 2004 
Pamela Anderson, July 2001 and August 2002
Christina Aguilera, October 2001
Nell McAndrew, February 2002
Jenna Jameson, January 2005
Melanie Sykes, March 2005
Jodie Marsh, December 2005
Lucy Pinder, January 2006
Raven Riley, March 2007
Eve Wyrwal, March 2008

See also
Ralph
FHM
Maxim
Hotdog
Page 3
Glamour photography
Chris (Simpsons artist)

References 

Men's magazines published in the United Kingdom
Monthly magazines published in the United Kingdom
Magazines established in 1998
Magazines disestablished in 2015
Defunct magazines published in the United Kingdom